Monika Sozanska (born 13 March 1983) is a Polish- German épée fencer. She has won several medals at the German Championships. Sozanska competed at the 2012 Summer Olympics.

References

External links 
 Official Website 
 Profile at the European Fencing Championships

1983 births
Living people
People from Bolesławiec
German female fencers
Fencers at the 2012 Summer Olympics
Olympic fencers of Germany